This is a list of women writers who were born in Mexico or whose writings are closely associated with that country.

A
Liliana Abud (born 1948), actress, screenwriter
Griselda Álvarez (1913–2009), state governor, poet
Pita Amor, pen name of Guadalupe Teresa Amor Schmidtlein (1918–2000), actress, poet
María Anna Águeda de San Ignacio (1695–1756), nun, respected religious writer
Brigitte Alexander (1911–1995), German-born Mexican playwright, memoirist, actress, translator
María Luisa Algarra (1916–1957), Spanish-born Mexican playwright
Carolina Amor de Fournier (1908–1993), editor, publisher, non-fiction writer, translator
Tamara De Anda  (born 1983), feminist activist and writer
Ikram Antaki (1948–2000), Syrian-born Mexican poet, essayist, translator, wrote in Spanish, French and Arabic 
Elvia Ardalani (born 1963), poet, short story writer
Araceli Ardón (born 1958), journalist, novelist, short story writer
Inés Arredondo (1928–1989), Mexican writer, one of the most influential Mexican writers
Elena Arizmendi Mejia (1884–1949), autobiographer, feminist, established the Neutral White Cross
Concepcion Cabrera de Armida (1862–1937), mystic, religious writer, author of I Am: Eucharistic Meditations on the Gospel
Carolina Amor de Fournier (1908–1993) writer and founder of several publishing companies
Elena Arizmendi Mejia (1884–1949), journalist, autobiography, creator of the White Cross

B
Rowena Bali (born 1977), novelist, short story writer, poet
Carmen Barajas Sandoval (1925–2014), best selling biographer, non-fiction writer, screenwriter
Mimí Bechelani, since 1958 television screenwriter, poet
Sabina Berman (born 1955), playwright, short story writer, essayist, film director
Hortensia Blanch Pita (1914–2004), Cuban-born non-fiction writer, later moved to Mexico
Minerva Bloom (born 1959), poet, photographer
Carmen Boullosa (born 1954), leading poet, novelist, playwright
Liliana V. Blum (born 1974), short story writer, some works translated into English
Coral Bracho (born 1951), poet, translator
Anita Brenner (1905–1974), non-fiction author, children's literature author
Esperanza Brito de Martí (1932–2007), journalist, feminist, journal director
Maritza M. Buendía (born 1974), essayist, magazine publisher, some works translated into English

C
Amalia González Caballero de Castillo Ledón (1898–1986), diplomat, minister, essayist, playwright
Lydia Cacho (born 1963), investigative journalist, feminist
Adela Calva Reyes (born 1968), indigenous novelist, educator
María Enriqueta Camarillo (1872–1968), poet, novelist, short story writer, translator
Nellie Campobello (1900–1986), narrative writer, memoirist, poet, author of Cartucho
Julieta Campos (1932–2007), Cuban-Mexican novelist
Lorea Canales, since 2001, novelist, journalist
Nancy Cárdenas (1934–1994), actress, playwright, journalist, broadcaster, theatre director
Rosario Castellanos (1925–1974) poet, essayist, novelist
Rita Cetina Gutiérrez (1864–1908) poet, educator, feminist
Susana Chávez (1974–2011), poet, human rights activist
Ana Clavel (born 1961), novelist, short story writer
Teresa del Conde (1935–2017), art critic, historian 
Rosina Conde (born, 1954), narrator, playwright, poet
Elsa Cross (born 1946), poet, essayist, translator
Sor Juana Inés de la Cruz (1651–1695), nun, poet
Mireya Cueto (1922–2013), puppeteer, playwright, non-fiction writer
Briceida Cuevas (born 1969), poet

D
Amparo Dávila (1928-2020), poet, short story writer
Clementina Díaz y de Ovando (1916–2012), historian, essayist, non-fiction writer
Emma Dolujanoff (1922–2013), novelist
Guadalupe Dueñas (1910-2002), short story writer, essayist

E
Anilú Elías (born 1937) feminist writer
María de los Ángeles Errisúriz (born 1966), teacher, non-fiction writer
Ximena Escalante (born 1964), playwright, screenwriter, non-fiction writer
Laura Esquivel (born 1950), novelist, essayist, screenwriter
Cecilia Eudave (born 1968), short story writer, novelist, essayist, educator

F
Isabel Fraire (1934–2015), writer, poet, translator and literary critic
Malva Flores (born 1961), poet, short story writer, essayist
Mariana Frenk-Westheim (1898–2004), German-born Spanish-Mexican poet, translator

G
Hermila Galindo (1886–1954), magazine editor, feminist, politician
Francesca Gargallo (1956–2022), Italian-born Mexican novelist, poet
Marissa Garrido (1926-2021), telenovela playwright and writer 
Elena Garro (1916–1998), playwright, novelist, short story writer, biographer
María Luisa Garza (1887–1980), journalist, novelist
Eve Gil (born 1968), acclaimed novelist, short story writer, poet
Margo Glantz (born 1930), linguistic scholar, essayist, non-fiction writer
Dulce María González (1958–2014), journalist, poet, novelist, short story writer
Reyna Grande (born 1975), novelist, writing in English
Rosario Green (1941–2017), politician, diplomat, non-fiction writer
Juana Belén Gutiérrez de Mendoza (1875–1942), journalist, poet, feminist
Rosario María Gutiérrez Eskildsen (1899–1979), lexicographer, linguist, educator, poet
Eulalia Guzmán (1890–1985), archeologist, educator, feminist, writer

H
M. G. Harris, Mexican-born British children's writer, author of The Joshua Files (2008)
María Luisa Ocampo Heredia (1899–1974), novelist, playwright, translator
Luisa Josefina Hernández (born 1928), novelist, playwright, critic
Malú Huacuja del Toro (born 1961), novelist, playwright, screenwriter

J
Juana Inés de la Cruz (1651–1695), nun, important Golden Age scholar, poet, author of Loa to Divine Narcissus

K
Helen Kleinbort Krauze, Polish-born Mexican journalist since 1959, columnist, travel writer, with national newspapers and magazines
Laureana Wright de Kleinhans (1846–1896), journal editor, poet, non-fiction writer, feminist

L
Marcela Lagarde (born 1948), non-fiction author, politician, feminist
Marta Lamas (born 1947), feminist, professor, activist, non-fiction author and columnist
María Ernestina Larráinzar Córdoba (1854-1925), writer, novelist, teacher, religious order founder
Patricia Laurent Kullick (born 1962), short story writer and novelist
Mónica Lavín, (born 1955) novelist
Rossy Evelin Lima (born 1986), poet, linguist, translator
Guadalupe Loaeza (born 1946), novelist, short story writer, columnist
Pura López Colomé (born 1952), poet, translator
Margarita López Portillo (1914–2006) novelist and politician
Valeria Luiselli (born 1983), novelist, non-fiction writer, essayist

M
Guadalupe Marín (1895–1983) novelist, model
Sanjuana Martínez (born 1963), journalist, non-fiction writer
Ángeles Mastretta (born 1949), journalist, novelist
María Luisa Mendoza (1930–2018) journalist, novelist, columnist
Concha Michel (1899–1990), singer-songwriter, playwright, archivist and non-fiction writer
Margarita Michelena (1917–1998), poet, critic, translator, journalist
María del Carmen Millán (1914–1982), academic, writer, 1st woman elected to the Mexican Academy of Letters
Alice-Leone Moats (1908–1989), Mexican-born American journalist, columnist, travel writer 
Magdalena Mora (1952–1981), activist, feminist writer 
Myriam Moscona (born 1955), journalist, translator, poet
Angelina Muñiz-Huberman (born 1936), poet, short story writer
Verónica Murguía (born 1960), children's literature, fantasy fiction, novelist

N
Julia Nava de Ruisánchez (1883–1964), activist, educator, journalist, non-fiction writer
Guadalupe Nettel (born 1973), novelist, short story writer
Eva Norvind (1944–2006), Norwegian-born Mexican playwright, screenwriter, actress

O
Orlandina de Oliveira (born 1943), Brazilian-born Mexican sociologist, academic, non-fiction writer
Emilia Ortiz (1917–2012), painter, cartoonist, poet
Amaranta Osorio Cepeda (born 1978), playwright, actress

P
Cristina Pacheco (born 1941), journalist, television presenter
Susana Pagano (born 1968), novelist, short story writer
Edmée Pardo Murray (born 1965) novelist
Margarita Peña (1937-2018), non-fiction writer
Beatríz Peniche Barrera (1893–1976), poet, feminist, one of three first elected female politicians in Mexico
María Dolores Pérez Enciso (1908–1949), Spanish-born Mexican journalist, prose writer
Aline Pettersson (born 1938), novelist, poet
Hortensia Blanch Pita (1914–2004), Cuban born, Spanish and Mexican writer
Elena Poniatowska (born 1932), French-born Mexican journalist, essayist, novelist, non-fiction writer
María Luisa Puga (1944–2004), novelist, short story writer, essayist, children's writer
Hortensia Blanch Pita

R
Marta Randall (born 1948), Mexican-born American science-fiction novelist, short story writer
Antonieta Rivas Mercado (1900–1931), journalist, playwright
Cristina Rivera Garza (born 1964), novelist, short story writer, poet, non-fiction writer, translator
Margarita Robles de Mendoza  (1896–1954) feminist writer, journalist
Jesusa Rodríguez (born 1955), director, actress, playwright
Sandra Rodríguez Nieto, contemporary journalist
Rosamaría Roffiel (born 1945), poet, novelist, journalist, and editor
Emma Romeu, Cuban-born Mexican journalist, novelist, essayist

S
Sara Sefchovich (born 1949), novelist, essayist, translator
Esther Seligson (1941–2010), novelist, short story writer, poet, essayist, translator 
Carla Stellweg, art curator, writer

T
Altaír Tejeda de Tamez (1922–2015), short story writer, poet, playwright, essayist, journalist
Natalia Toledo (born 1968), poet, writes in Spanish and Zapotec
Elena Torres (1893–1970), revolutionary, women's rights activist, essayist, autobiographer
Gabriela Torres Olivares (born 1982), short story writer, novelist
Julia Tuñón Pablos (born 1948), historian, feminist writer

U
Lourdes Urrea (born 1954), poet, novelist, young adult writer

V
Estrella del Valle (born 1971), poet
Yolanda Vargas Dulché (1926–1999), journalist, comic book writer, author of Memín Pinguín
Socorro Venegas (born 1972), short story writer, novelist
Josefina Vicens (1911–1988), acclaimed novelist, screenwriter, journalist
Maruxa Vilalta (1932–2014), Spanish-born Mexican playwright, novelist
Andrea Villarreal (1881–1963), revolutionary, journalist, feminist
Carmen Villoro, (born 1958), poet, journalist, children's story writer

Z
Sylvia Aguilar Zéleny (born 1973), novelist, short story writer
Rose Zwi (1928–2018), Mexican-born South African novelist, short story writer

See also
List of Mexican writers
List of women writers
List of Spanish-language authors

References

-
Mexican
Writers
Writers, women